The Texas Balladeer is an album by Freddy Fender that was released in 1979.  It contains his covers of two hits on the U.S. pop charts, "Squeeze Box" and "Share Your Love."

Track listing 
Yours
Squeeze Box
My Special Prayer
Walk Under a Snake
Trapped
Share Your Love
He's Got Nothing On Me but You
Gotta Travel On
Turn Around
Rock Down in My Shoe

References 

1979 albums
Freddy Fender albums